Tavera is a commune in the Corse-du-Sud department of France on the island of Corsica.

Population

Transport 
The town is served by a station on the Corsican Railways.

See also 
Communes of the Corse-du-Sud department

References

Communes of Corse-du-Sud